Ronald Francis Ron Stone AM (born 10 September 1938) is a retired Australian bishop. He was the 10th Bishop of Rockhampton in the Anglican Church of Australia from 1996 to 2003.

Stone was educated at Taylors College, Melbourne and ordained in 1963. His first post was as a curate at Junee, after which he was priest in charge of Kameruka. He was rector of Kerang and then the Archdeacon of Bendigo. He was ordained to the episcopate as an assistant bishop in Tasmania before becoming Bishop of Rockhampton in 1996; he was installed there on 13 December 1996. He retired from this position in 2003. He is married to Lisbeth Stone.

References

1938 births
La Trobe University alumni
Anglican bishops of Rockhampton
Anglican archdeacons in Australia
Assistant bishops in the Anglican Diocese of Tasmania
Members of the Order of Australia
20th-century Anglican bishops in Australia
21st-century Anglican bishops in Australia
Living people